Thomas Jefferson Terral (December 21, 1882 – March 9, 1946) was an American attorney and the 27th governor of Arkansas.

Early life
Terral was born in Union Parish in northern Louisiana. He attended the University of Kentucky at Lexington, Kentucky and transferred to the University of Arkansas School of Law in Fayetteville from which he graduated in 1910. He was admitted to the bar in 1910 and established a private law practice in Little Rock. He also worked as a school teacher.

Career
From 1911 to 1915, Terral worked as an assistant secretary of the Arkansas Senate where he learned the mechanics of state politics. In addition to the Senate position, Terral served as deputy state superintendent of public instruction from 1912 to 1916. These dual positions allowed Terral to assembly a range of statewide political contacts.

State politics
In 1916, Terral was elected Arkansas Secretary of State and served two two-year terms from 1917 to 1921. He ran unsuccessfully for governor in the 1920 Democratic primary, having lost to Thomas Chipman McRae.

Preparing to run again for governor in 1924, Terral joined the Ku Klux Klan in Morehouse Parish, which adjoins his native Union Parish. Apparently, he was rejected for Klan membership by various chapters in Arkansas but wanted to show his commitment to the organization as he mounted his gubernatorial race. In the Democratic primary, prior to the institution of runoff elections in Arkansas, Terral defeated several opponents, including future Lieutenant Governor William Lee Cazort of Johnson County, the original choice of the Ku Klux Klan hierarchy. Terral also defeated John Ellis Martineau, who came back in 1926 to unseat Terral in the primary. In the general election held that year in October 1924, Terral defeated Republican John W. Grabiel, an Ohio native and an attorney from Fayetteville who had also run unsuccessfully against Governor McRae in 1922. Terral received 99,598 votes (79.8 percent) to Grabiel's 25,152 (20.2 percent). Terral served as governor from  1925 to 1927.

During Terral's term the first state park was opened at Petit Jean Mountain. Construction of the state hospital was commenced during his tenure and the post of Commissioner of Insurance and Revenue was created. After one term, Terral was unseated in the Democratic primary by Martineau, who accused him of having previously taken kickbacks from publishers in developing the state-approved list of public school textbooks. Terral would become the first of three Arkansas governors denied second terms. The others were Francis Cherry, and Frank White.

Death
After his term as governor, Terral made three unsuccessful comeback bids for Governor and returned to his private law practice in Little Rock, where he died in 1946. Terral is interred at Roselawn Memorial Park Cemetery in Little Rock. He and his wife, Eula Terral (same maiden and married names), originally from Pine Bluff in Jefferson County, had no children.

See also
List of governors of Arkansas

References

External links 
 
 Encyclopedia of Arkansas History & Culture entry: Thomas Jefferson Terral
 State of Arkansas Governors

Democratic Party governors of Arkansas
Secretaries of State of Arkansas
Arkansas lawyers
20th-century American educators
1882 births
1946 deaths
People from Union Parish, Louisiana
Politicians from Little Rock, Arkansas
University of Kentucky alumni
University of Arkansas School of Law alumni
20th-century American politicians
Educators from Louisiana
American Ku Klux Klan members
20th-century American lawyers